"Mr Reginald Peacock's Day" is a 1920 short story by Katherine Mansfield. It was first published in the New Age on 14 June 1917, and later reprinted in Bliss and Other Stories.

Plot summary
Reginald is woken up by his wife for breakfast. He is irritated by his wife who is very polite with him. He has a bath, sings for a bit and fathoms he could be an opera singer. The couple then have a minor spat over the fact that she cooks for him, instead of having a servant doing it for them. After receiving a letter of admiration from Aenone Fell, he gives a lesson to Miss Brittle, then to the Countess Wilkowska, and to Miss Marian Morrow. He then goes to Lord Timbuck's party with his students for dinner. When he gets home he thinks his wife an ingrate for not celebrating his 'triumph', whilst it so happens that he did not even tell her he would be away for dinner.

Characters
Reginald Peacock, a singing teacher.
His wife
Adrian, Reginald's son.
Aenone Fell, a student of Reginald's.
Miss Betty Brittle, a student of Reginald's.
The Countess Wilkowska, a student of Reginald's.
Miss Marian Morrow, a student of Reginald's.
Lord Timbuck

Major themes
 Married life

Literary significance
The text is written in the modernist mode, without a set structure, and with many shifts in the narrative.

References to other works
Reginald says George Meredith's poem Love in the Valley in his morning bath, though it is misquoted.
He also refers to Richard Wagner's opera Lohengrin
With the Countess Wilkowska, he sings John Dowland's song from The Third and Last Booke of Songs or Aires, though it is misquoted.

Footnotes

External links
Full text

Modernist short stories
1920 short stories
Short stories by Katherine Mansfield
Works originally published in The New Age